Hierarchical proportion is a technique used in art, mostly in sculpture and painting, in which the artist uses unnatural proportion or scale to depict the relative importance of the figures in the artwork.

For example, in Egyptian times, people of higher status would sometimes be drawn or sculpted larger than those of lower status.

During the Dark Ages, people with more status had larger proportions than serfs. During the Renaissance images of the human body began to change, as proportion was used to depict the reality an artist interpreted.

Gallery

See also
 Art movement
 Creativity techniques
 List of art media
 List of artistic media
 List of art movements
 List of most expensive paintings
 List of most expensive sculptures
 List of art techniques
 List of sculptors

References

Citations

Bibliography
Artforms by Preble, Preble, Frank; Prentice Hall 2004

External links
'Gifts for the Gods: Images from Egyptian Temples, a fully digitized exhibition catalog from The Metropolitan Museum of Art Libraries, which contains material on hierarchical proportion

Artistic techniques